Wama or WAMA may refer to:

 Wama, Kenya, a settlement
 Wama District, in Afghanistan
 Ricinodendron, known in Ghana as wama, a tree and its oilseed
 Wama language:
 Akurio language (Surinam)
 Waama language (Benin)
 WAMA (AM), a radio station of Florida, U.S.
 Walter Anderson Museum of Art, in Ocean Springs, Mississippi, U.S.
 Washington Area Music Association, in Washington, D.C., U.S.

See also 
 
Waama language